The Divine Word College of San Jose is a private, Catholic, coeducational basic and higher education institution run by the Philippine Central Province of the  Society of the Divine Word or SVD in San Jose, Occidental Mindoro, Philippines. It holds the distinction of being the first and oldest educational institution in Mindoro island, even predating the island-province's separation into two provinces by five years, in 1950.

Established as Southern Mindoro Academy in the middle of 1945 by Gabriel Fabrero Fabella, a lawyer and prominent historian, it offered secondary education which became exclusive to boys upon its incorporation into the Society of Divine Word (SVD) in 1960. It was renamed to Divine Word College a year after its acquisition by the SVD, and has since offered complete academic courses from basic to tertiary education and postgraduate and vocational programs. Its patron saints are St. Arnold Janssen, the founder of the Society of the Divine Word, and St. Joseph Freinademetz, a missionary priest in China.

History 

In 1945, when World War II just ended, a visionary man from Romblon, Atty. Gabriel F. Fabella, a history professor at the University of the Philippines, came to San Jose. Together with his newfound friends, he envisioned the opening of a school to provide a private secondary education in San Jose.

On August 8, 1945, Southern Mindoro Academy was born and had its opening of classes on the same day in Central with 30 freshmen and 8 sophomores. The original incorporators of SMA were Gabriel Fabella, Raul Leuterio, Isabelo Abeleda, Sr., Cipriano Liboro and Cosme Tria.

The following year, in 1946, the Americans constructed an airstrip in San Jose Pandurucan and the people started to transfer to San Jose. Likewise, the owners of SMA decided to transfer the said school to San Jose and bought a portion of the land owned by the Soldevillas where the present school is now located.

SMA operated for 15 years. In 1960, due to financial constraints, the owners of SMA decided to sell it. Mr. Mena R. Quinto was instrumental in the SVD's acquisition of SMA. Fr. Carlos Brendel, the SVD representative and the parish priest of San Jose Pandurucan, bought SMA. Thus, in May in this same year the SVDs became the new owners of SMA. Still using the name SMA, the secondary department became an exclusive school for boys where St. Joseph became an exclusive school for girls.

Since then, additional undergraduate courses were offered by the school and eventually it got the government recognition for the following courses: Diploma in Junior Secretarial (1978), Bachelor of Science in Accountancy (1993), Two-year Computer Secretarial Courses (1997), Two-year Association in Computer Science (1997), Bachelor of Science in Computer Science (2001).

In the graduate level, DWCSJ started to offer Master of Arts in Education Major in Administration and Supervision as an extension of the Divine Word College of Calapan. Later, the school offered Master of Business Administration also as an extension of DWCC.

On June 29, 1993, government recognition to operate MBA independent of DWCC was obtained. Likewise, on March 15, 1995, government recognition to offer MA in Education independent of DWCC was granted.

In the same year, 1995, the school started to offer three levels of pre-elementary courses: Nursery, Kindergarten, and Preparatory.

Further, starting school year 2000-2001 several academic programs were simultaneously offered by DWCSJ; the AB in Communication, Bachelor of Science in Hotel and Restaurant Management (BSHRM) and Bachelor of Science in Tourism (BST). In the school year 2005-2006, the Bachelor of Science in Nursing was also offered. And Bachelor of Science in Accounting Technology (BSAct) and Bachelor of Science in Information Technology (BSIT) were offered in the school year 2009-2010.

Academic profile

Continuing Professional Development 
Divine Word College of San Jose is an accredited "Continuing Professional Development (CPD) Provider for Professional Teachers" granted by the Professional Regulation Commission in 2017 as one of its regulated programs. A CPD provider refers to a natural or juridical person who accredited by the CPD Council to conduct Continuing Professional Development Programs as defined by Republic Act (R.A.) 10912, "An act mandating and strengthening the Continuing Professional Development Program for all regulated professions, creating the Continuing Professional Development Council, and appropriating funds therefor, and for other related purposes".

Divine Word College of San Jose is duly accredited by Commission on Higher Education and the Department of Education (DepEd). The school's basic education level is also a candidate for accreditation by Philippine Accrediting Association of Schools, Colleges and Universities (PAASCU). It is also an institutional member of the Catholic Educational Association of the Philippines (CEAP).

Rankings and reputation 
The table below shows the school's academic standing for the past four exams of each board examinations:

Scholarship programs 
In response to tuition hikes and concessions made by the board, the student body and other stakeholders, the school implements a socialized tuition program categorized into basic components such as Subsidized Education, Scholarship Grants, and Student Assistanships with the help of various sectors and partner agencies such as the Commission on Higher Education (CHED), local government units (LGUs), charitable institutions, and stipend allowances for part-time working students and other financial assistance and student loan programs. These assistance programs are listed as follows:
 Academic scholars
 Alay-Lakad scholars
 Ayala-Yuchengco Foundation
 Bishop Vicente Manuel Foundation Inc.
 CHED StuFAP (Student Financial Assistance Program)
 CHED UniFAST (Unified Student Financial Assistance System for Tertiary Education) 
 DOLE - SPES (Department of Labor and Employment - Special Program for the Employment of Students)
 DWCSJ Working Scholars
 Provincial scholars/Congressional scholars
 San Jose Municipal Scholarship Program

Organization

Presidents of the Divine Word College of San Jose 
The President of the Divine Word College of San Jose is elected by the Board of Trustees for a three-year term and may be re-elected. The longest serving president was Fr. Eleuterio Lacaron, SVD who held the office for five consecutive terms for a total of fifteen (15) years, from 1990 to 2005.

As of 2017, two Americans and 10 Filipinos served as President of the Divine Word College of San Jose. Fr. Erasio Flores, SVD served as Assistant Director to Fr. Limon during his single term from 1960 to 1967. Fr. Joel Maribao, SVD served two non-consecutive terms, first was in 1979 to 1982 and again in 1988 to 1990.

The current and 13th president of DWCSJ is Fr. Renato A. Tampol, SVD, a Master of Arts graduate and member of the Divine Word School of Mission Studies. His installation as president took place at an investiture ceremony held on July 14, 2017, and has assumed office since then.

Student government 
The College Student Council (CSC) is the highest student governing body, encompassing all presidents and student leaders from different college departments and organizations. The council conducts various activities and forums such as symposiums on anti-bullying, anti-harassment and anti-drug, and leadership trainings to help raise awareness to students.

Guided by Ms. Ana Mae Tividad, Directress of Office of Student Affairs, the student council is a delegate to the 2014 National Congress of College Councils (NCCC) held at UP Diliman on March 7, 2014, through its president acting as Regional Ambassador for MIMAROPA region, and as such, a member of the National Alliance of Youth Leaders (NAYL). The council is also a delegate to the 10th PAPSAS (Philippine Association of Practitioners of Student Affairs and Services, Inc.) Interactive Youth Forum and Workshop for student leaders held on September 20, 2018, at Dauis, Bohol. The student council yearly conducts its election through a computerized system that started in July 2014.

Academic programs 
Divine Word College of San Jose offers 11 undergraduate and 4 postgraduate degree programs since its inception as a Higher Education Institution (HEI). The school offers tertiary programs in the fields of Business, Tourism, Information Technology, and Arts and Sciences. Starting school year 2018-2019, Bachelor of Science in Civil Engineering was added to its list of degree courses offerings. Accreditation to operate basic education level from preparatory to senior high school were likewise granted by the government.

Postgraduate 
The school was granted full autonomy to operate Master of Business Administration and Master of Arts in Education by the government in 1993 and 1995 respectively, independent of Divine Word College of Calapan. The school also offers a doctorate degree in Philosophy as an extension of Divine Word College of Calapan (DWCC) Graduate School.

Undergraduate 
The Bachelor of Science in Civil Engineering is offered through an extension program by Divine Word College of Calapan Department of Engineering. The school also offers a non-diploma program for foreign language studies through its International Language Center, including several European (Spanish, French, Italian) and Asian (Mandarin Chinese) language courses that started in 2016.

Basic education 
In addition to undergraduate and graduate programs, the school also has a senior high school program with Technical-Vocational-Livelihood (TVL) and Academic strands or tracks as part of the implementation of the K to 12 program of the Department of Education (DepEd).

Senior High School
The Divine Word College of San Jose is accredited by the Department of Education to operate Senior High School through program offerings in five (5) learning strands. This course serves as a preparatory and assessment level to help students choose the right course in college base on their capabilities.

Junior High School, Grade School, and Child Development Center
The secondary education level started as early as 1945 with the establishment of Southern Mindoro Academy as the school's predecessor, with a few freshmen and sophomore students. With the implementation of the K to 12 program in 2016, the secondary education was split into upper secondary level comprising the Senior High School, and the lower secondary level comprising the Junior High School level. The elementary level was introduced in 1985; likewise, the pre-school level was introduced through the Child Development Center in 1995.

Mangyan Education Program 
The Mangyan Education Program is the Community Extension Project of the Divine Word College of San Jose which aims to educate and give livelihood to the indigenous peoples of the province, namely the various Mangyan tribes living on the rural and mountainous areas. The school collaborated with the Local Government Unit (LGU) and the Far Eastern University and has sent 47 students to study at the main campus through the Community Extension Services Office. These students are housed at the Mangyan Education  Center in Arnoldus Village and are being trained for livelihood and culture preservation. Some out-of-school Mangyans of different ages living in far-flung regions of Sitio Bamban and Paclolo are taught at the basic education level using modular  approach through the Indigenous Learning System, a type of Alternative Learning System (ALS). The program is headed by its director, Bro. Vincent Iopam, SVD, hailing from Vanuatu.

College symbols and traditions

Official Seal
The Seal of the Divine Word College of San Jose is the official instrument used by the school as its official symbol and identity, and to certify its legal public documents and publications. The seal used when the school was originally established as Southern Mindoro Academy in 1945 features a map of Mindoro island over a white backdrop, enclosed by a circular white band with inner and outer black rings in which the then school abbreviation (SMA), its founding year (1945), and the name of the town of San Jose were inscribed.

When the academy was handed over to the Society of the Divine Word in 1960, the school adopted religious iconography, such as the cross over a mountain which symbolizes the Catholic Faith in Occidental Mindoro, and an eagle which symbolically represents St. John the Evangelist from whom the school was named. In the middle was a bend sinister dividing the shield in halves and bearing the school's acronym, DWC, which stands for Divine Word College. Over time, the seal was restyled to include a banderole emblazoned with the institution's original motto, "In the Light of the Word", derived from a passage in the Gospel of John.

Its latest iteration features a wedge-top escutcheon divided into four quadrants. In addition to the religious symbols, the seal now includes a Tamaraw on the first quarter, a bovine endemic to Mindoro island, and the logo of the Society of the Divine Word below it on the third quadrant. Superimposed in the middle of the shield is the college nickname, DWCSJ, which includes "SJ" as the initials for San Jose to distinguish it from other SVD schools in the province. The motto was also changed to its present form, "Witness to the Word".

DWCSJ Hymn
Divine Word College of San Jose Hymn is the college's official alma mater song. The lyrics was written by Demetrio Maglalang, an alumnus of the college. The melody for the song was composed by Rev. Fr. Erasio Flores, SVD, former assistant director of the school and Major Superior for SVD Philippine Central (PHC) region in Mindoro during the late 70's.

Lyrics
The following lists the complete lyrical text to the song, written as a poem in English:

Divine Got Talent and other activities
The Divine Word College of San Jose hosts a variety of school activities and events, mainly to commemorate the college's founding anniversary as a pioneering educational institution in the province and to celebrate its Christian teachings deeply influenced by its Filipino SVD culture. Some of the activities are annual events, such as religious celebrations like the Feast of the Immaculate Conception and the Holy Eucharist every first Wednesday of the month to mark the start and end of the academic year, orientation and acquaintance programs for freshmen and new students, annual talents exhibitions, and intercollegiate sporting competitions.

The school hosts the yearly Divine Got Talent (DGT) talent exhibition to showcase the students' talents in different fields such as singing, dancing, acting, and beauty pageantry. Started in 2017, it is a spin-off of the popular Got Talent global talent show franchise. Every students from basic education to tertiary level are encouraged to join the competition. The event is usually held during the first week of February to mark the college's founding anniversary. Winners in different competition categories are given prizes and trophies.

The Gabi ng Parangal is an annual service awards given to outstanding employees, students and alumni for their exemplary leadership, dedication and service to the school. The event coincides with the founding anniversary held during the first week of February. The event confers awards and special citations to candidates of various sectors and categories, such as the Ten Outstanding Students, Service Awardees for Years of Service, Special Award for Punctuality, and Loyalty Awards.

The college also joins the annual Alay Lakad together with other schools, government institutions, non-governmental organizations and other delegations from various sectors. Initiated by the Local Government Unit (LGU), it is a nationwide "walk for a cause" campaign that aims to raise funds for the out-of-school youth and provide scholarship grants to deserving but marginalized students. The fundraising campaign was started in 1972 by Alay Lakad Foundation, Inc. and has since been observed by various sectors around the country. The walkathon culminates with the awarding of Mr. and Ms. Alay Lakad and other special awards.

Divine Word College of San Jose also participates in several intercollegiate athletics tournaments such as the Private Schools Athletic Association (PRISAA) and the Inter-Catholic Schools Sports and Academic Meet (ICSSAM). The school hosted the 2018 Regional PRISAA Meet in March 2018. Aside from these, the school also holds its own college intramural sports every September led by the Sports Club Committee to celebrate team spirit and sportsmanship.

See also
 List of SVD schools

Notes

References

External links
 
 
History of the Town of San Jose, Rudy Candelario

Catholic universities and colleges in the Philippines
Universities and colleges in Occidental Mindoro
Educational institutions established in 1961
Catholic elementary schools in the Philippines
Divine Word Missionaries Order
1961 establishments in the Philippines